Ignatius I may refer to:

 Ignatius of Antioch, bishop in 68–107
 Ignatios of Constantinople, Patriarch of Constantinople in 847–858 and 867–877
 Ignatius of Bulgaria, Patriarch of Bulgaria c. 1272–1278
 Ignatius of Moscow, Patriarch of Moscow and all Russia in 1605–1606
 Ignatius I Daoud, Patriarch of Antioch of the Syrian Catholic Church in 1998–2001